Patrick Macnee's Ghost Stories, also known as Ghost Stories, Ghost Stories: A Paranormal Insight, and Real Ghost Stories, was a series of six specials that were originally released from October 2, 1997 to October 7, 1997. The specials were hosted by Patrick Macnee (of TV's The Avengers and The Howling.) The six specials were released separately and together on VHS and in several boxed sets on DVD. The specials investigate various hauntings and is similar to the format of Unsolved Mysteries. The series include such explorations as the legends of The Black Hope Horror, The Tower of London, Harriet’s Ghost and many more.

Selected Stations
These stations carry "Ghost Stories" from 1997 to 2002. From April 22, 2003 to August 12, 2003, it aired on The Sci-fi Channel.

Episodes

Releases
There have been several releases over the years. There has not been a new release since the 2004 set. All releases listed below remain out of print.

References

External links 
 

1990s American television series
Ghosts in television
Paranormal television